David Schultz (born June 1, 1955) is an American former professional wrestler. He competed in North American regional promotions Stampede Wrestling, the National Wrestling Alliance, and the American Wrestling Association in the late 1970s and early 1980s. During his short stint in the World Wrestling Federation in 1984, he gained notoriety by assaulting 20/20 reporter John Stossel during a report on the legitimacy of professional wrestling.

Professional wrestling career

Early career
Trained by Herb Welch, Schultz began wrestling in NWA Mid-America during the mid-1970s eventually teaming with Roger Kirby to defeat Bill Dundee and Big Bad John for the NWA Mid-America Tag Team Championship in May 1976. He would also team with Bill Ash to win the NWA Mid-America Tag Team Championship before losing the titles to George Gulas and Gorgeous George, Jr. later that year.

While in the Maritimes, he also defeated Terry Sawyer for the Canadian Heavyweight Championship in Halifax, Nova Scotia on August 9, 1977. Feuding with Sawyer over the title, he would briefly lose the title back to Sawyer before regaining it on August 13 and remained champion until the title became inactive before the end of the year.

Although losing to Bob Armstrong in a match for the NWA Southeastern Heavyweight Championship in 1978, he later regained the title the following year feuding over the title with Ron Slinker in mid-1979. Teaming with Dennis Condrey, the two later won the NWA Southeast Tag Team Championship after defeating Dick Slater and Paul Orndorff in November 1979 and successfully defended the titles for several months before the title was held up during a match against Mike Stallings and The Matador on February 3, 1980, and lost the titles to them in a rematch a week later.

From the Maritimes to Hartford
Returning to the Maritimes region, he wrestled as David von Schultz in Atlantic Grand Prix Wrestling later becoming the first AGPW US Heavyweight Champion on June 26, 1980. Defending the title against veterans such as Leo Burke, Stephen Petitpas and The Great Malumba throughout the summer, he eventually lost the title while he and the Cuban Assassin feuded with AGPW North American Tag Team Champions Leo Burke and Stephen Petitpas during his last weeks in the region.

During the next several years, he began wrestling for Stu Hart's Stampede Wrestling as part of Foley's Army feuding with Leo Burke and Mr. Hito over the Stampede Wrestling North American Heavyweight Championship during 1981 and also faced AWA World champion Nick Bockwinkel in a non-title interpromotional match. He also briefly teamed with Wayne Ferris as the Memphis Mafia before Ferris turned on him in a storyline in which he had been "bought" by manager J.R. Foley. The two would continue feuding with each other throughout Western Canada and eventually defeated Ferris in a steel cage match in Vancouver, British Columbia in 1983.

In 1984, while competing in Memphis, promoter Vince McMahon had become impressed with Schultz after watching an interview in which he had made derogatory remarks about Hulk Hogan during his brief stay in the area. He, along with tag team partner "Macho Man" Randy Savage and his brother Lanny Poffo, would become one of the first major regional wrestlers to be signed by Vince McMahon. Within a short time, had become one of the top "heels" in the promotion being aligned with Roddy Piper, Bob Orton and Paul Orndorff in their feud with "Superfly" Jimmy Snuka and later teamed with Piper and Orndorff to defeat S. D. Jones, Rocky Johnson and Bobo Brazil in a 6-man tag team match at the Capital Centre in Landover, Maryland. On June 17, he would also face WWF World Heavyweight Champion Hulk Hogan in Minneapolis, Minnesota.

Battery on John Stossel
Schultz had a notorious encounter on December 28, 1984, with 20/20 reporter John Stossel while Stossel was backstage at Madison Square Garden doing a story about professional wrestling's secrets. During an interview Stossel told Schultz that he thought pro wrestling was fake and Schultz's response was to hit Stossel in the head twice, knocking him to the floor each time. The attack, which attracted a large amount of media coverage, was later aired on national television including ABC News which reported that the network had received more than 1,000 calls from viewers inquiring about Stossel's health.

Marvin Kohn, a deputy commissioner at the New York State Athletic Commission, had been present at the arena during the incident and immediately suspended Schultz for his actions. Although called by Commissioner Jose Torres to attend a hearing before the commission, Kohn later reported that Schultz had written a letter to the commission admitting "that he had acted improperly and apologized both to the commission and to Mr. Stossel" and further stated "I admit the allegations ... I intend the commission to know that I did not intend to hurt John Stossel. I apologize to the commission and to John Stossel."

Stossel stated that he suffered from pain and buzzing in his ears eight weeks after the assault. Stossel later claimed he was unaware of Schultz's apology and would pursue his action in court although commented he would be "less likely to sue" if the after-effects of his injury disappeared. Stossel eventually filed a lawsuit against the World Wrestling Federation, and settled out of court for $280,000. In his book, Myths, Lies, and Downright Stupidity, Stossel writes that he has come to regret filing charges, having adopted the belief that lawsuits harm hundreds of innocent people.

Although Schultz has consistently maintained that World Wrestling Federation officials told him to hit Stossel (specifically, he insists that Vince McMahon himself said, "Blast him (Stossel), tear his ass up, stay in character -- 'Doctor D'..."), Schultz ultimately was fired. Many industry insiders believe that it was not because of his actions against Stossel, but rather because he challenged Mr. T to a fight backstage at a WWF show at Madison Square Garden.

Later career and retirement
Moving to Connecticut, Schultz opened a successful bail bonds business and began a second career as a professional bounty hunter. 

Schultz briefly reappeared in the spotlight in the early 1990s when Vince McMahon was accused of illegally distributing anabolic steroids. Although Hulk Hogan was considered to be the prosecution's major witness, Schultz was one of several former WWF wrestlers called to testify against McMahon at the trial although McMahon would eventually be acquitted of all charges against him.

Post-wrestling
During the early 2000s, Schultz was under consideration for induction into the Professional Wrestling Hall of Fame and Museum in November 2003, and the following month, attended the Fan Slam Convention in Totowa, New Jersey on December 6, 2003. During the event, he participated in a Q&A panel which included Hulk Hogan, Ted DiBiase, Virgil, Gary Michael Cappetta, Chief Jay Strongbow and The Missing Link.

In October 2006, Schultz was honored along with J. J. Dillon and Missy Hyatt at a dinner banquet hosted by the Professional Wrestling Hall of Fame and attended by former WWF wrestlers from the 1970s and 80s. During the event, he would participate on a Q&A panel discussing the Professional Wrestling Hall of Fame and taking questions from audience members as well as conducted a "shoot interview" with RF Video. As part of their agreement, RF Video donated $500 in his name to the Professional Wrestling Hall of Fame Building Fund and later presenting a check to Professional Wrestling Hall of Fame President Tony Vellano.

Schultz released his book, Don't Call Me Fake, on January 23, 2018.

On April 28, 2020, Dark Side of the Ring aired a second season episode that focuses on Schultz's wrestling career, his assault on John Stossel that ended his wrestling career, and his transition as a bounty hunter.

Championships and accomplishments
Atlantic Grand Prix Wrestling
AGPW United States Heavyweight Championship (1 time)
Cauliflower Alley Club
Men's Wrestling Award (2019)
Eastern Sports Association
NWA Canadian Heavyweight Championship (Halifax version) (2 times)
Lutte Internationale
Canadian International Heavyweight Championship (1 time)
NWA Mid-America
NWA Southern Tag Team Championship (1 time) – with Dennis Condrey
NWA Mid-America Tag Team Championship (1 time) – with Bill Ash
NWA Six-Man Tag Team Championship (1 time) – with Great Togo and Tojo Yamamoto
Southeastern Championship Wrestling
NWA Southeastern Heavyweight Championship (Northern Division) (1 time)
NWA Southeastern Heavyweight Championship (Southern Division) (1 time)
NWA Southeastern Tag Team Championship (1 time) – with Dennis Condrey
Northeast Championship Wrestling
NCW Heavyweight Championship (1 time)
Pro Wrestling Illustrated
Ranked No. 253 of the top 500 singles wrestlers of the "PWI Years" in 2003
Stampede Wrestling
Stampede North American Heavyweight Championship (3 times)
Stampede Wrestling Hall of Fame (Class of 1995)
Universal Wrestling Alliance
UWA Heavyweight Championship (1 time)

References

Further reading
Oliver, Greg and Steven Johnson. The Professional Wrestling Hall of Fame: The Heels. Toronto: ECW Press, 2007.

External links 
 

1955 births
American male professional wrestlers
Bounty hunters
Living people
People from Madison County, Tennessee
Professional wrestlers from Tennessee
Professional wrestling controversies
Stampede Wrestling alumni
20th-century professional wrestlers
Stampede Wrestling North American Heavyweight Champions